Lancôme is a French luxury perfumes and cosmetics house that distributes products internationally. Lancôme is part of the L'Oréal Luxury Products division, which is its parent company and offers luxury skin care, fragrances, and  makeup at higher-end prices.

History

Founded in 1935 by Guillaume d'Ornano and his business partner Armand Petitjean in France, as originally a fragrance house. The name "Lancôme" was inspired by the forest of Lancosme that lies in the Indre valley in the heart of France in the region of  - the name was chosen by Guillaume's wife Elisabeth d'Ornano. The roses in the area inspired the company's symbol of the single golden rose.

Lancôme launched its first five fragrances in 1935 at the World's Fair in Brussels: Tendre Nuit, Bocages, Conquete, Kypre and Tropiques. Petitjean entered into the luxury skincare market, launching Nutrix, his first "all-purpose repair cream" in 1936, followed by make-up, cosmetics, and skincare products. Lancôme was acquired by L'oreal in 1964, and quickly became part of its luxury products division.

Products

The company provides fragrances, skin care, and makeup. Their most famous products include their mascaras, namely "Hypnôse", their Visionnaire Range which contains a patented ingredient, "LR 2412", aimed to improve skin texture color qualities, especially in pore reduction, fine lines and uneven skin tone.

Lancôme fragrances are made in association with perfumers: Alain Astori, Annick Menardo, Daniela Roche-Andrier, Christian Biecher, Jacques Cavallier, Calice Becker, Pauline Zanoni, Maurice Roucel, Thierry Wasser, Christine Nagel, Armand Petitjean, Gerard Goupy, Olivier Cresp, Harry Fremont, Alberto Morillas, Dominique Ropion, Olivier Polge, Francis Kurkdjian, Robert Gonnon, Nathalie Lorson, Sophia Grojsman, and Alienor Massenet.

Since 2014, the fragrance La Vie Est Belle is the best-selling fragrance in Lancôme historic market, France.

In 2021, the 24h long-lasting "Lash idole mascara" has become the bestselling product and received the expert's choice beauty award.

Advertising 
Despite founder Armand Petijean's assertion that Lancôme never advertise, today Lancôme is one of the top advertisers in the luxury beauty arena. Its ads can be seen in numerous publications worldwide, from Harper's Bazaar to French Vogue. Lancôme's ads have been shot by the leading photographers, including Peter Lindbergh, Mario Testino, Mario Sorrenti, Nick Knight, Steven Meisel, Brigitte Lacombe, Patrick Demarchelier and Dusan Reljin.

A 2011 publicity video was produced in Paris and featured Emma Watson, forgetting her hat in a Parisian book store and Cyril Descours, the shop assistant, returning it to her on the banks of the Seine later that evening. In 2012 Lancôme premiered a TV advertisement featuring 1930s cartoon icon Betty Boop. Supermodel Daria Werbowy and Betty talk candidly as Betty gives Daria advice about how to find a role in her "first big film". This advertisement has been uploaded to YouTube by Sephora and has achieved more than 100000 views in 2018.

In 2017, Lancôme Paris partnered with the software developer Perfect Corp. to introduce new mobile app experience allowing customers to try on makeup and make direct purchases through the app.

Spokesmodels and spokespersons 
The brand is represented by actresses, global supermodels, makeup artists and perfumers. Emerging fashion designers have collaborated with the brand, including design duo Proenza Schouler, who created a dress inspired by Lancôme's Hypnôse fragrance, and Alber Elbaz who designed the packaging for a trio of mascaras.

In 1978, at the age of eighteen, Carol Alt became the youngest model to be the face of Lancôme. Nancy Dutiel also modeled for Lancôme during this period. More recently, models Shalom Harlow, Marie Gillain and Raica Oliveira have also been spokesmodels for Lancôme.

One of Lancôme's longest-running partnerships was with actress Isabella Rossellini. Signed in 1982, Rossellini was the international face of Lancôme for 14 years. In 2016, Rossellini returned for a collaboration with the brand, more than 30 years after she became its first face.

Ukrainian-Canadian model Daria Werbowy joined the brand in 2005, and has been featured in Lancôme ads. Spanish actress and model Inés Sastre has represented Lancôme as a global spokesmodel since 1996, appearing in dozens of Lancôme advertisements over the years.

In September 2008, Dominican model Arlenis Sosa became the spokesmodel for the brand.

in 2009, Isabella Rossellini's daughter Elettra Rossellini Wiedemann became the new face of Lancôme.

In 2010, ipsy founder Michelle Phan signed a deal with Lancôme.

Other renowned actresses have also worked with the brand, including Juliette Binoche, Uma Thurman, Drew Barrymore, Mena Suvari, Laura Morante, Kate Winslet, Anne Hathaway, Julia Roberts, Penélope Cruz, Emma Watson, and currently Lily Collins, Lupita Nyong'o, and Zendaya. Clive Owen was the first male spokesperson for Lancôme's Men's skincare range and the fragrance Hypnôse Homme.

Presently, popular south Korean Singer and Actress Bae Suzy is the Asia Pacific Brand Ambassador and also Lancome's Global Muse.

In 2023, the content creator, Emma Chamberlain, was announced to be the brand's new 'face' and 'global ambassador'.

Digital marketing in Lancôme
Digital marketing is used to build relationships with customers and interact with them on time. Lancôme targets women in their 40s and younger women have become its new target market.

Social media marketing

In 2014, Lancôme launched a marketing campaign which combines a loyalty program called 'Lancôme Elite Rewards' via social media platforms. This program gives points as the reward to members for sharing on social media. Members can earn points by sharing products or connecting with the brand on Facebook, Twitter and Instagram and they will get discount while getting enough points. Through the combination of giving rewards and social media platforms in this campaign, it would attract more engagement and word of mouth publicity that resulted in the increased effectiveness of digital marketing in Lancôme.

In 2017, Lancôme formed a partnership with Airbnb and Publicis Worldwide's luxury agency 133SH to release a new social media campaign for promoting the new Lancôme UV expert aqua gel. This social media campaign aimed to reach more young female consumers.

Makeup artists
Lancôme has collaborated with several makeup artists. Fred Farrugia created 13 colour collections during his tenure as artistic makeup director (1997–2004). 

Lancôme has several top makeup artists representing it, Aaron De Mey and Sandy Linter. Sandy is Lancôme's "Beauty At Every Age Expert", and Aaron is Lancôme's National Artistic Director for Makeup. Aaron De Mey is no longer the Artistic Director for Lancome. Lancôme UK has recently signed Alex Babsky to be the brand's UK Make Up Ambassador.

Lancôme Makeup announced in January 2015 that UK makeup artist Lisa Eldridge has been appointed as its Global Creative Director.

Controversy

Hong Kong

On 5 June 2016, Lancôme canceled a promotional concert by Hong Kong pro-democracy singer Denise Ho that was scheduled to be held on 19 June in Sheung Wan. The cancellation was due to a boycott campaign launched by the Communist Party-controlled Global Times, which denigrated the Cantopop star for supposedly advocating Hong Kong and Tibet independence. Lancôme posted on Facebook that Ho is not a spokesperson for the brand. The cancellation drew a heavy backlash in Hong Kong, resulting in some Lancôme shops in Hong Kong shutting down during the protests. Some Hong Kong merchants refused to accept the political pressure from the Chinese government. Listerine, another brand that Ho represents, retained the singer despite criticism from the Global Times for hiring Ho as its spokesperson.

Ho ended up playing the concert without Lancôme's support.

References

External links
Lancôme online Boutique 

Cosmetics companies of France
French brands
History of cosmetics
L'Oréal brands
Personal care brands